The second season of Philippines' Next Top Model (subtitled as Philippines' Next Top Model: High Street) premiered on March 21st, 2017 on TV5. The series was initially not picked up by RPN after its first season in 2007. In 2013, Solar Entertainment put an effort to produce a second season, but later on cancelled the series. The show announced in late 2016 via Facebook that it would be returning in 2017 on TV5.

The second season was presented by actress and model Maggie Wilson, who took over from model and beauty queen Ruffa Gutierrez. The judging panel was also fully revamped, consisting of Miss International 2016 titleholder Kylie Verzosa, Rainer Dagala and Raphael Kiefer.

The winner of the competition was 25-year-old Angela Lehmann from Bicol.

Prizes 

1 year talent contract With TV5. 
A trip for 2 to Hong Kong courtesy of Philippine Airlines. 
1 year ambassadorship worth 2 million pesos with SM Woman. 
1 year Golds Gym Elite membership.

Auditions 
Auditions were held in Baguio, Mandaluyong, Cebu, Davao, in January 2017. Applicants were also encouraged to apply for the competition online if they were unable to make an appearance at the live auditions.

Cast

Contestants
(Ages stated are at start of contest)

Results

 The contestant was eliminated
 Indicates that the contestant quit the competition
 Indicates the contestant was part of a non-elimination bottom two
 The contestant won the competition

Notes

Scoreboard 

 Indicates that the contestant had the highest score or best performance
 Indicates that the contestant was eliminated 
 Indicates that the contestant quit the competition
 Indicates the contestant was part of a non-elimination bottom two
 Indicates that the contestant won the competition

Average call-out order
Episode 11 is not included.

Bottom two

 The contestant was eliminated after their first time in the bottom two. 
 The contestant was eliminated after their second time in the bottom two. 
 The contestant was eliminated after their third time in the bottom two. 
 The contestant was eliminated after their fourth time in the bottom two. 
 The contestant was eliminated in the first round of elimination and placed third
 The contestant was eliminated and placed as the runner-up. 
 The contestant was disqualified.
 Indicates that the contestant quit the competition

References

External links
 Official website

Top Model
2017 Philippine television seasons